is an agency of the city government of Kobe, Japan that operates municipal subways and city buses. Previously, it also operated city trams.

Subway
Kobe Municipal Subway
Seishin-Yamate Line
Kaigan Line
Hokushin Line

Bus
Kobe City Bus

Tram

The city tram of Kobe opened in 1910 by a private company and was purchased by the city government in 1917. As of 1952, it operated 35.6 km of tracks. The tram system was totally abolished by 1971.
Between 1917 and 1971, the trams operated approximately 600 million kilometers and transported 5.6 billion passengers.

References

External links 
  
  

Intermodal transport authorities in Japan